Sante Ceccherini (15 November 1863 – 9 August 1932) was an Italian fencer. He won a silver medal in the team sabre event at the 1908 Summer Olympics.

References

1863 births
1932 deaths
Italian male fencers
Olympic fencers of Italy
Fencers at the 1908 Summer Olympics
Olympic silver medalists for Italy
Olympic medalists in fencing
Medalists at the 1908 Summer Olympics